Artemidorus Capito(n) (Greek: Ἀρτεμίδωρος ὁ Καπίτων, Artemídōros ho Kapitōn) was a Greek physician and grammarian at Rome.

Life 
Artemidorus was a Greek physician and grammarian active at Rome in the reign of the emperor Hadrian, AD 117–138. He was a relation of Dioscorides, who also edited the works of Hippocrates, and he is frequently mentioned by Galen.

Works 
He published an edition of the works of Hippocrates, which Galen tells us was not only much valued by the Emperor himself, but was also much esteemed even in Galen's time. He is, however, accused of making considerable changes in the text, and of altering the old readings and modernising the language.

Identity 
Artemidorus may perhaps be the person sometimes quoted simply by the name of Capito, although this is quite uncertain. Capito, a physician, probably lived in the first or second century AD, and appears to have given particular attention to diseases of the eyes. His prescriptions are quoted by Galen and Aëtius.

See also 

 Ancient Greek medicine
 Medicine in ancient Rome
 Galenic corpus

References

Notes

Citations

Bibliography 

 Greenhill, William Alexander (1867). "Artemidorus Capito". In Smith, William (ed.). Dictionary of Greek and Roman Biography and Mythology. Vol. 1. Boston: Little, Brown, & Co. p. 374.
 Greenhill, William Alexander (1867). "Capito (4)". In Smith, William (ed.). Dictionary of Greek and Roman Biography and Mythology. Vol. 1. Boston: Little, Brown, & Co. p. 599.
 Salazar, Christine F., ed. (2006). "Artemidorus (8) Capiton". In Brill's New Pauly: Encyclopaedia of the Ancient World. Brill Publishers. Retrieved 26 April 2022.

2nd-century Greek physicians